Events in the year 1969 in Norway.

Incumbents
 Monarch – Olav V
 Prime Minister – Per Borten (Centre Party)

Events

 6 April – Railway accident occurs in Darbu, resulting in the deaths of 8 people.
 8 September – The 1969 Parliamentary election takes place.
 24 December – The oil company Phillips Petroleum made the first oil discovery in the Norwegian sector of North Sea.
 The Dissenter Act was abolished.

Popular culture

Sports

Music

Film

Literature
Olav Nordrå, writer, is awarded the Riksmål Society Literature Prize.

Notable births
 
 

24 February  – Merita Berntsen, beach volleyball player.
1 March – Kamilla Gamme, diver.
27 March – John-Arne Røttingen, medical scientist, research administrator and civil servant.
4 May – Cathrine Grøndahl, poet.
15 May – Carsten Thomassen, journalist killed in 2008 Kabul Serena Hotel attack (died 2008)
21 May – Håkon Haugli, politician and business executive.
25 May – Ragnhild Kostøl, cyclist.
1 June – Siv Jensen, politician.
15 June – Linda Cerup-Simonsen (born as Linda Andersen), sailor.
18 June – Anne Marit Bjørnflaten, politician
24 June – Sissel Kyrkjebø, Soprano
11 August – Atle Antonsen, comedian
7 September – Jannicke Stålstrøm, windsurfer.
2 October – Trine Skei Grande, politician
3 October – Ingeborg Hovland, footballer.
4 November – Line Miriam Sandberg, politician.
6 November – Elin Floberghagen, journalist and organizational leader.
25 November – Kim Ofstad, drummer and composer
27 November – Sidsel Dalen, journalist and crime fiction writer.
28 November – Hanne Ørstavik, writer.
29 November – Anniken Huitfeldt, politician and Minister.

Full date unknown
Morten Øen, poet and author
Gard Sveen, crime fiction writer.

Notable deaths

9 January – Erling Kristvik, educator (born 1882).
19 January – Lars Evensen, trade unionist and politician (born 1896)
22 January – Isak Larsson Flatabø, politician (born 1896)
12 February – Reidar Sørlie, discus thrower (born 1909)
16 February – Eivind Stenersen Engelstad, archaeologist and art historian (born 1900)
24 February – Johan Bernhard Hjort, judge (born 1895)
22 March – Alf Lie, gymnast and Olympic gold medallist (born 1887)
8 May – Armand Carlsen, speed skater and world record holder (born 1905)
11 April – Ludvig Irgens-Jensen, composer (born 1894)
1 June – Ivar Ballangrud, speed skater and multiple Olympic gold medallist (born 1904)
2 June – Christen Christensen, pair skater (born 1904)
11 June – Knut Knutsson Steintjønndalen, Hardanger fiddle maker (born 1887)
21 June – Arne Rostad, politician (born 1894)
15 July – Sverre Gjørwad, politician (born 1885)
17 July – Thoralf Glad, sailor and Olympic gold medallist (born 1878)
4 August – Marie Hamsun, actor and writer (born 1881)
18 August – Kristian Geelmuyden, politician (born 1875)
16 September – Tidemann Flaata Evensen, politician (born 1905)
12 October – Sonja Henie, figure skater, three time Olympic gold medallist, World Champion and actress (born 1912)
18 October – Theodor Platou, brewer (born 1892).
12 November – Ragnhild Larsen, diver (born 1900)
25 November – Peder P. Næsheim, politician (born 1925)
8 December – Ole Singstad, civil engineer in America (born 1882)
11 December – Jens Gunderssen, singer, songwriter, actor, stage producer and theatre director (born 1912)
12 December – Sigurd Høgaas, politician (born 1892)
12 December – Bjarne Kjørberg, politician (born 1916)
15 December – Willy Røgeberg, rifle shooter and Olympic gold medallist (born 1905)

Full date unknown
Friedrich Georg Nissen, civil servant (born 1887)

See also

References

External links